Reagan Day can refer to:

 Ronald Reagan Day, a day in California to commemorate Governor Ronald Reagan
 Reagan Day Dinner (or Reagan Dinner, Lincoln–Reagan Dinner, etc.), an annual fundraising event for the Republican Party